Acalypha fruticosa is a species of flowering plant in the botanical family Euphorbiaceae. It occurs widely in East and southern Africa where it is eaten as a vegetable. It is also an important browse plant for sheep. In East Africa and southern Africa it is used as a medicinal plant. In northern Kenya arrow shafts and beehive lids are made from the stem. From the dried leaves a tea is made in Ethiopia.

Geographic distribution 
Acalypha fruticosa occurs in East and parts of southern Africa, except humid central Africa. It also occurs in tropical Arabia, southern India, Sri Lanka and Myanmar.

References

External links 

PROTA4U on Acalypha fruticosa

fruticosa
Leaf vegetables
Plants used in traditional African medicine
Taxa named by Peter Forsskål